The K-300P Bastion-P (NATO reporting name SS-C-5 Stooge) is a Russian mobile coastal defence missile system. The system was developed together with the Belarusian company Tekhnosoyuzproekt.

Design
The main role of the Bastion-P is to engage surface ships including carrier battle groups, convoys, and landing craft. Upon halting, missiles can be readied for firing within five minutes, and both fired in 2-5 second intervals. The mobile launcher can remain on active standby over a period of 3–5 days, or up to 30 days when accompanied by a combat duty support vehicle.

The missile used by the Bastion-P is the P-800 Oniks, a supersonic anti-ship missile with a  warhead.  They are fired vertically from the launchers using a solid-fuel rocket booster for initial acceleration, then use a liquid-fuel ramjet for sustained cruising at Mach 2.5.  The Oniks/Yakhont's maximum range varies at  using a low-low or hi-low flight trajectory respectively. Using GLONASS at the initial flight stage and active radar guidance when approaching a target, the missile can fly to an altitude of  before descending to sea-skimming altitude of 5 m at the final stage, useful up to sea state 7. "These complexes are able to destroy both sea and ground targets at a distance of 350 kilometers at sea and almost 450 kilometers over land," Defense Minister Shoigu said at Russian President Vladimir Putin's meeting with representatives of the Defense Ministry.

Operational history
On 2 March 2011, it was reported that Russia would be deploying the system on the Kuril Islands in the Far East. The deployment was finally conducted in 2016.

On 15 March 2015, it was reported that Russia had deployed the system in Crimea. Silo-based missile complex was deployed on Object 100 in 2020.

In 2015, Russian Northern Fleet Commander Adm. Vladimir Korolev said that Russia's Northern Fleet's Coastal Forces would receive new Bastion anti-ship missile complexes to support already existing S-400 deployments.

On 15 November 2016, Russia announced it had deployed K-300P Bastion-P systems to Syria, where it fired Oniks missiles at land targets as part of the Russian military intervention in Syria, demonstrating a previously undisclosed land attack capability for the coastal defense system; the P-800 uses a combination of autopilot, INS, and a radio altimeter for mid-course guidance and a monopulse dual-mode active/passive seeker for terminal guidance.  Modified software in the Bastion's guidance system enables the missiles to dive onto stationary land targets, striking programmed coordinates.

In 2021, Matua island in the Kuril Islands now hosts a battery.

The Bastion is the primary launch platform of the Onyx missile during the Russian Invasion of Ukraine. Sevastopol in particular has seen a number of recorded Onyx launches, distinguished by the missile's distinctive "one-turn" launch sequence. These are primarily used to strike cities in the south of Ukraine.

In 2022, Paramushir island in the Kuril  Islands now hosts an additional battery.

Variants 
 K-300P - TEL variant, LACM or AShM, used mainly in coastal missile forces.
 K-300S - silo based version, probably one of the roles will be in coastal missile forces.
 Bastion E - another coastal variant.

Operators

 and coastal missile forces have 40 such systems

 Vietnam People's Navy - bought at least two systems in early 2011. Commissioned by the coastal missile & artillery forces
 - bought four systems in 2011

See also
3K60 Bal
A-222 Bereg

References

External links
 "Bastion" launch. Video.

Anti-ship cruise missiles of Russia
NPO Mashinostroyeniya products
Post–Cold War weapons of Russia
Military vehicles introduced in the 2010s
Military equipment introduced in the 2010s